The McGerrigle Mountains are a mountain range in the central part of Gaspésie in eastern Quebec, Canada. It is the main constituent of the Chic-Choc Mountains belonging to the Notre Dame Mountains, in the Appalachian chain.

Toponymy 
Formerly called Tabletop, in 1965 the massif was renamed McGerrigle Mountains in honor of the geologist Harold William McGerrigle (1904-1970) who worked for the government of Quebec between 1937 and 1970.

Main peaks 
 Mont Jacques-Cartier
 Whaleback Mountain
 Mont de la Passe
 Mount Richardson (Quebec)
 Mont Comte
 Mont Rolland-Germain
 Mont Les Cones
 Mont du Vieillard
 Table Mountain
 Petit Mont Sainte-Anne
 Mont Xalibu
 Mont Joseph Fortin

See also 

 List of mountains of Quebec

References 

Notre Dame Mountains
Mountains of Quebec
Geography of Gaspésie–Îles-de-la-Madeleine
La Haute-Gaspésie Regional County Municipality
Mountain ranges of Quebec